John Grey (c. 1724 – 25 February 1777) was a British politician, the younger son of Harry Grey, 3rd Earl of Stamford. He was the Clerk of the Green Cloth from 1754 until his death, and at the 1754 general election he was elected unopposed  as one of the two Members of Parliament (MPs) for Bridgnorth in Shropshire. He was re-elected unopposed in 1761, and stood down in 1768 to be elected at Tregony instead.

In May 1748, he married Lucy, daughter of Sir Joseph Danvers, 1st Baronet. They had no children.

References

1720s births
1777 deaths

Year of birth uncertain
Younger sons of earls
Members of the Parliament of Great Britain for English constituencies
British MPs 1754–1761
British MPs 1761–1768
British MPs 1768–1774